Desert Hot Springs High School, also abbreviated as DHSHS, is a public high school for grades 9–12. It is located in Desert Hot Springs, California. The school is one of four comprehensive high schools in the Palm Springs Unified School District.

History
Desert Hot Springs High School opened on September 7, 1999, with an initial enrollment of 642. The school began with freshmen and sophomores and added a class each year with graduating its first class of 162 seniors in June 2002. Desert Hot Springs High School serves students from the communities of Desert Hot Springs, North Palm Springs, Sky Valley, and the unincorporated areas of Painted Hills and Mission Lakes.

Enrollment
The student population in the 2007–2008 school year was 1,974.

References

3. http://www.desertsun.com/story/sports/high-school/2017/05/13/dhs-boys-tennis-team-ends-historic-season-lays-groundwork-future-success/313543001/

Educational institutions established in 1999
High schools in Riverside County, California
Desert Hot Springs, California
Palm Springs Unified School District
Public high schools in California
1999 establishments in California